The canopy piloting event at the 2005 World Games in Duisburg was played from 15 to 17 July. 10 parachuters, from 6 nations, participated in the tournament. The competition took place at Toeppersee Nordufer Duisburg.

Competition format
Athletes competed in three events: accuracy, distance and speed. In each event they had to compete two times.

Results

References

External links
 Results on IWGA website

Canopy piloting